Alovas is a Malakula language of Vanuatu.

References

Further reading

Malekula languages
Languages of Vanuatu